Ryan Lee Mountcastle (born February 18, 1997) is an American professional baseball first baseman for the Baltimore Orioles of Major League Baseball (MLB). He made his MLB debut in 2020.

Amateur career
Mountcastle attended Hagerty High School in Oviedo, Florida. He was drafted by the Baltimore Orioles in the first round with the 36th overall selection of the 2015 Major League Baseball draft. He signed for $1.3 million, forgoing his commitment to play college baseball at the University of Central Florida.

Professional career

Minor leagues

Mountcastle signed with the Orioles and was assigned to the Gulf Coast League Orioles to begin his professional career. After batting .313 with three home runs and 14 RBIs in 43 games in the GCL, he was promoted to the Aberdeen IronBirds, where he batted .212 in ten games to finish the season. In 2016, Mountcastle spent the season with the Delmarva Shorebirds where he posted a .281 average with ten home runs and 51 RBIs along with a .745 OPS in 115 games. In 2017, Mountcastle spent time between the Frederick Keys and the Bowie Baysox, batting a combined .287 along with a career high 18 home runs and 62 RBIs in 127 games between both teams. After the season, he played in the Arizona Fall League and played in the Fall Stars Game.

MLB.com ranked Mountcastle as Baltimore's third best prospect going into the 2018 season. He spent 2018 with Bowie, slashing .297/.341/.464 with 13 home runs and 59 RBIs in 102 games. In 2019, Mountcastle spent the season with the Norfolk Tides, and switched to first base. After slashing .312/.344/.527 with 25 home runs and 83 RBIs over 127 games, he was named the International League Most Valuable Player. Following the season, he was added to the Orioles 40–man roster.

Baltimore Orioles
On August 21, 2020, Mountcastle was promoted to the major leagues and made his MLB debut same day. On August 22, 2020, Mountcastle had his first major league hit against the Boston Red Sox in the bottom of the ninth inning. On August 30, he hit his first MLB home run. On the season for Baltimore, Mountcastle slashed .333/.386/.492 with five home runs and 23 RBIs over 35 games.

Mountcastle returned to Baltimore for the 2021 season as their starting first baseman and also spent time in left field and as their designated hitter. On June 7, 2021, Mountcastle was named American League Player of the Week, after hitting safely in all six games he played in, and going 11-for-24 (.458) with four home runs, three doubles, ten RBIs and a 1.563 OPS. On June 19, Mountcastle had his first career three-home run game against the Toronto Blue Jays, launching two off of Toronto starter Alek Manoah and one off of reliever Anthony Kay. Over 144 games for the season, he slashed .255/.309/.487 with 33 home runs, 89 RBIs, and 23 doubles. His 33 home runs were the most ever by an Orioles rookie, and he led the major leagues in home runs by a rookie.

References

External links

1997 births
Living people
Aberdeen IronBirds players
Baltimore Orioles players
Baseball players from Florida
Bowie Baysox players
Delmarva Shorebirds players
Frederick Keys players
Gulf Coast Orioles players
Major League Baseball first basemen
Major League Baseball outfielders
Norfolk Tides players
People from Winter Springs, Florida
Salt River Rafters players
Sportspeople from Seminole County, Florida